The 2018–19 Luxembourg Women's Cup was the eighteenth Luxembourg Women's Cup in football. The competition began on 13 October 2018 and the final was held on 1 June 2019. Racing won their first Luxembourg Women's Cup after defeating Wormeldange/Munsbach/CSG 4–0.

Preliminary round 

The matches were played on 13 October 2018.

|}

Round of 16 

The matches were played on 8 December 2018 and 11 December 2018.

|}

Quarterfinals

The matches were played on 20 April 2019 and 1 May 2019.

|}

Semifinals 

The matches were played on 15 May 2019.

|}

Final

The final was played on 1 June 2019.

Match officials
Assistant referees:
 Vakil Shania
 Vaz Leite Bruno Tiago
Fourth official: Thomas Loïc

References

Women's Cup